Zaccheaus L. Pickens (born March 6, 2000) is an American football defensive tackle for the South Carolina Gamecocks.

High school career
Pickens attended T. L. Hanna High School in Anderson, South Carolina. As a senior in 2018, he was named the Gatorade Football Player of the Year for South Carolina after recording 87 tackles, six sacks and one interception which he returned for a touchdown. A five-star recruit, Pickens was selected to play in the 2019 Under Armour All-American Game. He committed to the University of South Carolina to play college football.

College career
As a true freshman at South Carolina in 2019, Pickens played in all 12 games and had 16 tackles. As a sophomore in 2020, he started seven of 10 games, recording 35 tackles and one sack. As a junior in 2021, he started all 13 games, finishing with 38 tackles and four sacks. Pickens returned to South Carolina for his senior season in 2022.

References

External links
South Carolina Gamecocks bio

2000 births
Living people
Players of American football from South Carolina
American football defensive tackles
South Carolina Gamecocks football players